Guaijaverin is the 3-O-arabinoside of quercetin. It is found in the leaves of Psidium guajava, the common guava.

References 

Quercetin glycosides
arabinosides
Psidium